The siege of Beirut took place in summer 1982, as part of the 1982 Lebanon War, which resulted from the breakdown of the ceasefire effected by the United Nations. The siege ended with the Palestinian Liberation Organization being forced out of Beirut and the rest of Lebanon.

Historical setting

The PLO moved its primary base of operations to Beirut in the early 1970s, after Black September in Jordan. The presence of Palestinian forces was one of the main reasons that led to a conflict in Lebanon in 1975–1976 which ended with the occupation of Lebanon by peacekeeping forces from several Arab countries, including Syria. Over the next few years, the Syrians and the PLO gained power in Lebanon, surpassing the ability of the official Lebanese government to curtail or control their actions. Throughout this time, artillery and rocket attacks were launched against Israel. Israel bombed targets in Lebanon and in 1978 launched a military invasion in to Southern Lebanon codenamed "Operation Litani".

In 1978, and again in 1981 and early 1982, the United Nations sponsored a ceasefire, and Israeli troops were withdrawn. In 1982 Israel re-invaded Lebanon following the attempted assassination of its ambassador in London, despite being aware that the attack had been carried out by the Abu Nidal faction, which was at war with Yasser Arafat's PLO. The architect of the war, Ariel Sharon (then Defense Minister), presented it to the Israeli government as a limited incursion into Southern Lebanon but took his troops to Beirut.
The invasion was code-named "Operation Pines" or "Peace for Galilee", and was intended to weaken or evict the PLO and impose Bachir Gemayel, head of the Christian Phalange party, as President of Lebanon in order to get Lebanon to sign a peace treaty with Israel and bring the country into Israel's sphere of influence. This plan failed when Gemayel was assassinated not long after being elected President by the Lebanese parliament under Israeli pressure.

The Israeli forces invaded in a three-pronged attack. One group moved along the coastal road to Beirut, another aimed at cutting the main Beirut-Damascus road, and the third moved up along the Lebanon-Syria border, hoping to block Syrian reinforcements or interference. By the 11th of June, Israel had gained air superiority after shooting down a number of Syrian aircraft; Syria called for a cease-fire, and the majority of PLO guerrillas fled Tyre, Sidon, and other areas for Beirut.

Siege
 

The ring around Beirut was closed by 13 June 1982, 7 days after the start of Israeli invasion to Lebanon. PLO and part of Syrian forces were isolated in the city.

Israel hoped to complete the siege as quickly as possible; their goal all along in invading Lebanon was for a quick and decisive victory. In addition, the United States, through their representative Philip Habib, was pushing for peace negotiations; the longer the siege took, the greater Arafat's bargaining power would be.

At first Israelis thought that Maronite forces would eradicate the PLO quasi-government in Beirut, but it turned out that the Maronites were not prepared to undertake this task. For the IDF, the capture of Beirut in street-to-street fighting would have involved unacceptable level of casualties. This is why the method chosen, was the combination of military pressure and psychological warfare to persuade the PLO that the only alternative to surrender was total annihilation.

For seven weeks, Israel attacked the city by sea, air, and land, cutting off food and water supplies, disconnecting the electricity, and securing the airport and some southern suburbs, but for the most part coming no closer to their goals. As with most sieges, the population of the city, thousands of civilians, suffered alongside the PLO guerrillas. Israel was roundly accused of indiscriminately shelling the city in addition to the other measures taken to weaken the PLO. By the end of the first week of July 500 buildings had been destroyed by Israeli shells and bombs.

On 14 July, Sharon and chief of staff Rafael Eitan obtained Prime Minister Begin's support for a large scale operation to conquer West Beirut in order to achieve the eviction of the PLO. But the plan was rejected on 16 July by the full Israeli cabinet, out of concern for heavy loss of life. Some parties threatened  to leave the ruling coalition if the plan was adopted.

At the end of July, with negotiations still deadlocked, the IDF intensified its attacks. Mossad, using their Phalangist contacts, sent Arab agents into Beirut with car bombs in order to terrorize the Palestinians into submission and the Lebanese to increase pressure for their departure. Dozens of people were killed in these bombings. Some of the Israeli agents were caught and ultimately confessed.

The Israeli Air Force intensified missions specifically designed to assassinate Palestinian leaders – Yassir Arafat, Abu Jihad and Salah Khalaf (Abu Iyad). The Israelis were assisted by agents with transmitters on the ground. Although a number of apartment houses were destroyed with hundreds of Palestinians and Lebanese killed or wounded, the leaders managed to evade bombings.

On 10 August, when American envoy Philip Habib submitted a draft agreement to Israel, Sharon, probably impatient with what he regarded as American meddling, ordered a saturation bombing of Beirut, during which at least 300 people were killed. That bombing was followed by a protest to the Israeli government by President Ronald Reagan. In response, on 12 August, the Israeli cabinet stripped Ariel Sharon of most of his powers; he was not allowed to order the use of air force, armored force and artillery without agreement of the cabinet or prime minister.

During the siege, the Israelis secured several key locations in other parts of Lebanon, but did not manage to take the city before a peace agreement was finally implemented. Although Syria had agreed on 7 August, Israel, Lebanon, and the PLO finally agreed, with US mediation, on the 18th. On 21 August, 350 French paratroopers arrived in Beirut, followed by 800 US Marines and Italian Bersaglieri plus additional international peacekeepers (for a total force of 2,130) to supervise the removal of the PLO, first by ship and then overland, to Tunisia, Yemen, Jordan, and Syria. Altogether 8,500 PLO men were evacuated to Tunisia, and 2,500 by land to other Arab countries.

Results
In the end, Israel succeeded in ending the rocket attacks for a very short period, and routed the PLO from Lebanon. The siege also saw the insubordination and subsequent dismissal of the 211th Armor Brigade commander, Eli Geva, who refused to lead his forces into the city, arguing this would result in "the excessive killings of civilians."

Following the siege of Beirut, Arafat fled to Greece, and then to Tunis, establishing a new headquarters there. PLO fedayeen continued to operate out of Yemen, Algeria, Iraq, and the Sudan, as well as within Israeli-controlled territory.

In late 1983, 4,000 Arafat loyalists were evacuated from Tripoli on five Greek vessels.

International reaction
  United States: The siege was condemned by Israel's traditional close ally, the United States, who warned Israel that weaponry provided by the United States was only to be used for defensive purposes. The U.S. government at one point even considered threatening sanctions against Israel in order to stop Israel from launching an assault on West Beirut in August 1982. It was reported by the Ottawa Citizen (originally from a New York Times interview) that during one of two phone conversations on 12 August between US president Ronald Reagan and Israeli Prime Minister Menachem Begin, Reagan angrily described the bombing of West Beirut as a "holocaust".
  Israel: While Prime Minister Begin did not deny that civilians were hurt, and he reportedly expressed regrets over the loss of innocent life, he stressed that their deaths were "...not the Israelis' fault".
  Soviet Union: The Soviet Union tried to pass a United Nations resolution calling for a worldwide arms embargo on Israel, which was vetoed by the U.S.

Aftermath
Bachir Gemayel, the Lebanese president-elect, was killed in Eastern Beirut a few weeks after the withdrawal of PLO forces. His death resulted in the Lebanese Forces entering the Sabra and Shatila refugee camps and slaughtering almost two thousand Palestinian civilians, mostly women, children and the elderly. This occurred under the supervision of Israeli troops who illuminated the areas with flares and provided bulldozers for mass burials of the victims.

Decades after the siege, the event was cited by Osama bin Laden as a major reason for the September 11, 2001, attacks.

See also

 United Nations Interim Force in Lebanon
 Memory for Forgetfulness

References

 An Nahar, September 1, 1982.
 Davis, M. Thomas. 40 km into Lebanon.  Washington, DC: National Defense University Press (1987), pp. 96–101.
 Davis, Paul K. Besieged: 100 Great Sieges from Jericho to Sarajevo. Oxford: Oxford University Press (2000).
 Gabriel, Richard.  Operation Peace for Galilee: The Israel-PLO War in Lebanon.  New York: Hill and Wang (1984).
 Rabinovich, Itmar.  The War for Lebanon 1970–1985. Ithaca: Cornell University Press (1985).
 Shlaim, Avi. The Iron Wall. New York: Norton press (1999)
 Morris, Benny The righteous victims. New York: Vintage books (2001)

External links
Lebanese civil war 1982 pictures and information. This website is from a pro-Lebanese perspective (Free Patriotic Movement)

1982 Lebanon War
1980s in Beirut
Attacks on buildings and structures in 1982
Attacks on buildings and structures in Beirut
August 1982 events in Asia
Battles in 1982
Battles of the Lebanese Civil War
July 1982 events in Asia
June 1982 events in Asia
Beirut